A funeral director, also known as an undertaker (British English) or mortician (American English), is a professional involved in the business of funeral rites. These tasks often entail the embalming and burial or cremation of the dead, as well as the arrangements for the funeral ceremony (although not the directing and conducting of the funeral itself unless clergy are not present). Funeral directors may at times be asked to perform tasks such as dressing (in garments usually suitable for daily wear), casketing (placing the corpse in the coffin), and cossetting (applying any sort of cosmetic or substance to the best viewable areas of the corpse for the purpose of enhancing its appearance). A funeral director may work at a funeral home or be an independent employee.

Etymology
The term mortician is derived from the Roman word mort- (“death”) + -ician. In 1895, the trade magazine The Embalmers' Monthly put out a call for a new name for the profession in the US to distance itself from the title undertaker, a term that was then perceived to have been tarnished by its association with death. The term Mortician was the winning entry.

History
As the societal need to account for the dead and their survivors is as ancient as civilization itself, death care is among the world's oldest professions. Ancient Egypt is a probable pioneer in supporting full-time morticians; intentional mummification began  2600 BC, with the best-preserved mummies dating to  1570 to 1075 BC. Specialized priests spent 70 full days on a single corpse. Only royalty, nobility and wealthy commoners could afford the service, considered an essential part of accessing eternal life.

Across successive cultures, religion remained a prime motive for securing a body against decay and/or arranging burial in a planned manner; some considered the fate of departed souls to be fixed and unchangeable (e.g., ancient Mesopotamia) and considered care for a grave to be more important than the actual burial.

In ancient Rome, wealthy individuals trusted family to care for their corpse, but funeral rites would feature professional mourners: most often actresses who would announce the presence of the funeral procession by wailing loudly. Other paid actors would don the masks of ancestors and recreate their personalities, dramatizing the exploits of their departed scion. These purely ceremonial undertakers of the day nonetheless had great religious and societal impact; a larger number of actors indicated greater power and wealth for the deceased and their family.

Modern ideas about proper preservation of the dead for the benefit of the living arose in the European Age of Enlightenment. Dutch scientist Frederik Ruysch's work attracted the attention of royalty and legitimized postmortem anatomy. Most importantly, Ruysch developed injected substances and waxes that could penetrate the smallest vessels of the body and seal them against decay.

Historically, from ancient Egypt to Greece and Rome to the early United States, women typically did all of the preparation of dead bodies. They were called "Layers out of the dead". Mid nineteenth century, gender roles within funeral service in the United States began to change. Late nineteenth century it became a male dominated industry with the development of Funeral Directors, which changed the funeral industry both locally and nationally.

Role in the United States
In 2003, 15 percent of corporately owned funeral homes were owned by one of three corporations. The majority of morticians work in small, independent family-run funeral homes. The owner usually hires two or three other morticians to help them. Often, this hired help is in the family, perpetuating the family's ownership. Other firms that were family-owned have been acquired and are operated by large corporations such as Service Corporation International, though such homes usually trade under their pre-acquisition names.

Most funeral homes have one or more viewing rooms, a preparation room for embalming, a chapel, and a casket selection room. They usually have a hearse for transportation of bodies, a flower car, and limousines. They also normally sell caskets and urns.

Organizations and licensing in the United States
Licensing requirements in the US are determined at the state level. . Most require a combination of post-secondary education (typically an associate's degree), passage of a National Board Examination, passage of a state board examination, and one to two years' work as an apprentice.

Role in the UK 
The role that a funeral director will play in the UK includes most of the administrative duties and arrangement of funeral service, including flower arrangements, meeting with family members, overseeing the funeral and burial service. This does not include embalming or cremation of the body until further training is completed.

Organizations and licensing in the UK 
In the UK no formal licence is required to become an undertaker (funeral director). There are national organizations such as the British Institute of Funeral Directors (BIFD), the National Association of Funeral Directors (NAFD) and the Society of Allied and Independent Funeral directors (SAIF)
The BIFD offers a licence to funeral directors who have obtained a diploma-level qualification – these diplomas are offered by both the BIFD and NAFD.

The British institute of embalmers (BIE) offers embalming training and qualifications.

All of the national organizations offer voluntary membership of "best practice" standards schemes, which includes regular premises inspection and adherence to a specific 'code of conduct'
These organizations help funeral directors demonstrate that they are committed to continual personal development and they have no issue with regulation should it become a legal requirement [13].

Role in Canada 
The role of a funeral director in Canada can include embalming, sales, oversight of funeral services as well as other aspects of needed funeral services.

Organizations and licensing in Canada 
A funeral director in Canada will assume many responsibilities after proper education and licensing. Courses will include science and biology, ethics, and practical techniques of embalming. There are a number of organizations available to Canadian funeral directors.

References

Persons involved with death and dying
Sales occupations